Typhlotrechus is a genus of blind beetles in the family Carabidae, containing the following species:

 Typhlotrechus bilimekii Sturm, 1847
 Typhlotrechus velebiticus Ganglbauer, 1904

References

Trechinae